Neoepilobocera gertraudae is a species of cave-dwelling crab from Cuba.

Classification
The species was first described by Gerhard Pretzmann as Epilobocera gertraudae in 1965. N. gertraudae is classified in the family Pseudothelphusidae, and is the only species in the genus Neoepilobocera. It is considered by some authorities to be synonymous with the widespread Epilobocera cubensis.

Distribution
It is only found in karstic caves in Viñales and nearby parts of Pinar del Río Province, Cuba.

Description
Neoepilobocera gertraudae differs from the other freshwater crabs of Cuba, all in the genus Epilobocera, by its longer legs and paler coloration, both of which are adaptations to living in caves. It is smaller than Epilobocera, reaching a carapace length of only , and with a flattened body.

References

Pseudothelphusidae
Fauna of Cuba
Freshwater crustaceans of North America
Monotypic arthropod genera
Taxobox binomials not recognized by IUCN